Cruachan may refer to:

Cruachan, Ireland, the ancient capital of the kingdom of Connachta in Ireland
Cruachan (band), an Irish Celtic metal band
Ben Cruachan, a Scottish mountain
Cruachan Dam A hydropower station at Ben Cruachan
Cruachan, the name of a Shetland pony as mascot of the Argyll and Sutherland Highlanders (now of the Royal Regiment of Scotland)
Cruachan! is the battle cry for Highland clans Campbell and MacIntyre